Zhang Tianlong (Chinese: 张天龙; Pinyin: Zhāng Tiānlóng; born 26 February 1992) is a Chinese football player who currently plays as a left-back or centre-back for Qingdao Hainiu.

Club career
Zhang joined Chinese Super League newcomer Guangzhou Evergrande from Shandong Luneng youth academy in 2011. He transferred to China League One side Shenzhen Ruby in February 2012. He made his senior debut on 17 Match 2012 in a 1–0 away win against Beijing Baxy.

Zhang transferred to his hometown club Liaoning with his teammate Ding Haifeng in February 2014. He was sent to the reserved team in 2015. On 18 September 2016, he made his debut for Liaoning in a 6–2 away defeat against Guangzhou Evergrande. In February 2017, Zhang was loaned to Nei Mongol Zhongyou for the 2017 season. He made his debut for the club on 18 March 2017 in a 5–0 away defeat against Shanghai Shenxin. On 22 April 2017, he scored his first senior goal in a 1–1 away draw against Meizhou Hakka. He made a permanent transfer to Nei Mongol Zhongyou in 2018.

Zhang transferred back to Liaoning on 28 February 2019. His return was not a happy one, his wages were paid late after the club admitted they were in financial difficulties. After helping guide the club avoid relegation the team disbanded at the end of the 2019 China League One campaign due to wage arrears. He would join another second tier club in Taizhou Yuanda the following season, however he faced the same challenges and was free to leave for Nantong Zhiyun, after the club disbanded at the end of the 2020 China League One campaign.

On 13 April 2022, Zhang transferred to second tier club Qingdao Hainiu. He would go on to make his debut in a league game on 9 June 2022 against Shaanxi Chang'an Athletic in a 1-1 draw. He would go on to establish himself as regular within the team that gained promotion to the top tier at the end of the 2022 China League One campaign.

Career statistics 
.

References

External links
 

1992 births
Living people
Chinese footballers
Association football defenders
People from Jinzhou
Footballers from Liaoning
Guangzhou F.C. players
Shenzhen F.C. players
Liaoning F.C. players
Inner Mongolia Zhongyou F.C. players
Taizhou Yuanda F.C. players
Chinese Super League players
China League One players
21st-century Chinese people